Kranti is a 2006 Bengali film directed by Riingo Banerjee and produced under the banner of Eskay Movies. The film features actors Jeet and Swastika Mukherjee in the lead roles. This film marks the directorial debut of Riingo Banerjee, who also composed the music for the film. The film was a big success in the career of Jeet. The film also was a commercial success. Ashish Vidyarthi was Vishnu (the mafia leader) in this film. The film is an adaptation of the Telugu film Siva.

Plot 
Jeet (Jeet) is a student whose family, consisting of his parents and elder sister Devashree (Locket Chatterjee), migrated to the city Kolkata. Since their arrival, they have to struggle amongst the crowd to exist. People of the city fear Vishnu (Ashish Vidyarthi), the local don. His younger brother Deva (Rishi Kaushik) studies in the same college as that of Jeet. Deva's gang in the college are the biggest troublemakers, who tease girls and pass bad comments at them. Jeet, who tries to handle the situation, clashes with Deva's gang for a number of times and beats his gang members. In retaliation, Vishnu's goons start attacking his family members and friends. One day they spot Debashree on the road and assaults her. They rape her one by one in public. Police started investigating, and an Inspector (Rajesh Sharma) was assigned, and he sought to punish the wrongdoers, but he wasn't able to punish them as Vishnu and his gang were too much powerful and had many politicians support. They also kill his college friend Iqbal (Biswanath Basu) for standing against Vishnu in elections. Jeet, in a fit of rage, killed Vishnu's younger brother Deva inside a car, strangulating his neck with a copper wire to avenge his friend Iqbal's death. Vishnu couldn't bear the loss of his so loving brother, infuriated and disturbingly killed Jeet's father (Bodhisatwa Majumdar). A helpless and heartbroken Jeet is left with nothing, but only a strong desire to punish the wrongdoers. He becomes determined to kill Vishnu. In the end, Jeet is successful in killing Vishnu, thus fulfilling his revenge.

Cast 
 Jeetendra Madnani as himself
 Swastika Mukherjee as Arpita
 Alokananda Roy as Sohini Ghosh, Jeet's mother
 Ashish Vidyarthi as Vishnu, a dreaded gangster supported by politicians
 Bodhisattwa Majumdar as Shridhar Ghosh, Jeet's father
 Locket Chatterjee as Debashree, Jeet's elder sister
 Biswanath Basu as Iqbal
 Raja Chattopadhyay
 Rishi Kaushik as Deva, Vishnu's younger brother
 Rajesh Sharma as Inspector Ranajoy
 Bhola Tamang

Soundtrack

References 

2006 films
Bengali-language Indian films
Films scored by Jeet Ganguly
Films scored by Rishi Chanda
Films scored by Riingo Banerjee
Films scored by Samidh Mukherjee
Bengali remakes of Telugu films
Films directed by Riingo Banerjee
Indian action thriller films
Indian thriller drama films
Indian action drama films
2006 action thriller films
2006 thriller drama films
2006 action drama films
2000s Bengali-language films